Ukrainian Sign Language (USL) is the sign language of the deaf community of Ukraine. Ukrainian Sign Language belongs to the family of French sign languages. Worldwide awareness of Ukrainian Sign Language rose sharply in 2014 after the release of a Ukrainian film The Tribe, where actors communicated in Ukrainian Sign Language with no spoken dialogue.

History and education
The teaching of Ukrainian Sign Language to deaf students began in the early 1800s, when a number of branches of the Vienna School for the Deaf were opened in Ukraine, namely the Institute for Deaf in Volyn in 1805 in Romaniv, then the Halychyna School for the Deaf in 1830 in Lviv and a few years later the Odesa School for the Deaf in 1843 in Odesa.

During the Soviet occupation of Ukraine, the development of teaching methods for Ukrainian sign language slowed down considerably, since the use of Ukrainian sign language in educational systems of the USSR was banned soon after the negative feedback given by Joseph Stalin to sign languages in his 1950 article Marxism and Problems of Linguistics. In it, Stalin called deaf people "anomalous human beings" and described gesture language as "not a language at all, but a surrogate".

The use of Ukrainian sign language in educating deaf people in Ukraine didn't get reintroduced until 2006. , there were 39 preschools for deaf children in Ukraine teaching pre-schoolers (6 years or younger); there were 61 specialized secondary schools for children with hearing impairments teaching deaf pupils ages 6 through 18 (this includes both day-time schools and boarding schools). However, most schools emphasize oral proficiency in Ukrainian and do not encourage use of USL.

From 2006 to 2016, the governing body that publishes language textbooks and research articles and regulates the methods of teaching Ukrainian sign language was the Laboratory of sign language at the Institute of Special Education of National Academy of Educational Sciences of Ukraine. It was established in 2006. In 2016 it was reorganized into Department of sign language at the Institute of Special Education of National Academy of Educational Sciences of Ukraine.

NGOs 
The Ukrainian Society of the Deaf (UTOG) was established in 1933, and since 1957 has been a permanent member of the World Federation of the Deaf (WFD) as well as a member of the WFD Eastern Europe and Middle Asia Regional Secretariat. UTOG was established as an organization of Ukrainians with hearing impairments, both deaf and hearing-impaired ones, to provide them with assistance in their professional, labor and social rehabilitation, in protecting their lawful rights and interests and in asserting themselves as citizens that are fully integrated into society. Excluding hearing impaired in the temporarily Russia-occupied Ukrainian regions of Eastern Ukraine and Crimea, there were 43,108 registered Ukrainian nationals with hearing impairments , of whom 38,746 persons are members of UTOG (approximately 90%).

USL research 
In 2007 Western Canadian Centre of Studies in Deafness at the University of Alberta established the Ukrainian Sign Language Project, headed by Dr. Debra Russell, to support the recognition of USL as the language of instruction for Deaf children in Ukraine. Its outcomes were projected to document USL, create a USL teaching curriculum for teacher education and parents of Deaf children, formalize the training of interpreters, and improve the training of teachers of the Deaf.

Relationship between USL and RSL/MSL 
One study is suggestive of some sort of relationship between USL and the sign languages of Russia and Moldova, but does not provide any conclusive evidence as to whether they are the same or different languages. In a 2005 study of Eastern European signed languages, a wordlist from Ukrainian Sign Language had about 70% similarity to wordlists from Russian Sign Language and Moldovan Sign Language. Noting that these three SLs had as high a lexical similarity as what was "found within certain countries, although not as high as what was found within ASL", the author recommended that "these countries should be investigated further to see how much difference there is between them: whether they represent different dialects of the same language or closely-related languages," and that future, more detailed, study should "use more precise measures such as intelligibility testing, rather than relying on wordlist comparisons alone." The study's closing remarks warn against inappropriate interpretation of the results, noting that "a preliminary survey of this sort is not meant to provide definitive results about the relatedness or identity of different languages. Besides the various caveats mentioned above, another important factor is that lexical similarity is only one facet of what is involved in comparing languages. Grammatical structure and other differences can be just as significant; two languages can have very similar vocabulary but enough other differences to make it difficult for people to communicate with each other.".

Fingerspelling
Ukrainian Sign Language uses a one-handed manual alphabet, or fingerspelling, based on the alphabet used in Old French Sign Language, but adapted to spell out words from the Ukrainian language.  Known as the Ukrainian manual alphabet, it consists of 33 signs which make use of the 23 handshapes of USL.  Some of these signs thus share handshapes; for example, the signs for Г & Ґ use the same handshape but in one the thumb is still, while in the other it moves up and down.

In USL as in other sign languages, fingerspelling serves as a type of borrowing from Ukrainian. It is used for proper nouns, for technical terms with no native USL equivalent, abbreviations of longer Ukrainian words, and some colloquial Ukrainian words. Fingerspelling may also be used instead of a synonymous sign for emphasis.

A common misconception is that USL consists only of fingerspelling. Although communication using only fingerspelling has been used, it is not USL.

Use in films
Плем'я (The Tribe) (2014)

See also
 Ukrainian Manual Alphabet
 American Sign Language

Relevant literature
 Lukyanova, S. P. (2001). Деякі аспекти розвитку нечуючих / Some issues in the development of nonhearing persons. Proceedings of the First Ukrainian Conference on the History of Deaf Education in Ukraine (pp. 216–218). Kyiv: UTOG 
 Russell, D. (2008). Ukrainian signed language: Bridging research and educational practice. Proceedings of the 2nd International Scientific Conference: The Ukrainian Diaspora in the Global Context Lʹviv. 2008. 277 pp. (p. 258 – 259).
 Kobel, I. (2009). Ukrainian hearing parents and their deaf children (Doctoral dissertation, University of Alberta)] 233 pp.
 Kulbida, S. V. (2009) "Ukrainian sign language as a natural notation system." scientific journal «Sign language and modern»: К.: Pedagogicha dumka (2009): 218–239.
 Krivonos, Yu G., et al. (2009) "Information technology for Ukrainian sign language simulation." Artificial Intelligence 3 (2009): 186–198.
 Davydov, M. V., I. V. Nikolski, and V. V. Pasichnyk. (2010) "Real-time Ukrainian sign language recognition system." Intelligent Computing and Intelligent Systems (ICIS), 2010 IEEE International Conference on. Vol. 1. IEEE, 2010.
 Davydov, M. V., et al. (2013) "Providing Feedback in Ukrainian Sign Language Tutoring Software." Rough Sets and Intelligent Systems-Professor Zdzisław Pawlak in Memoriam. Springer Berlin Heidelberg, 2013. 241–261.

References

External links
 Department of sign language education at the Institute of Special Education of National Academy of Educational Sciences of Ukraine 
 Official website of the Ukrainian Society of the Deaf 
 Official website of "Spred the sign" initiative (Ukrainian Sign Language version) 
 Ukrainian Sign Language Project at the University of Alberta, (2007–2011)
 Ukrainian Sign Language at Gallaudet University sign languages catalog
 Ukrainian Sign Language at Ethnologue: Languages of the World, Nineteenth edition. Dallas, Texas: SIL International. 2016
 Ukrainian Sign Language: a language of Ukraine – Open Language Archives
 Ukrainian Sign Language at MultiTree:A Digital Library of Language Relationships

Languages of Ukraine
French Sign Language family
Languages attested from the 19th century